This is a list of hospitals in the United States that are verified as trauma centers by the American College of Surgeons.


List
The list below shows the hospital name, city and state location, number of beds in the hospital, adult trauma level certification, and pediatric trauma level certification:

State navigation templates

References

 
Trauma centers